Quang Vinh (full name: Trần Quang Vinh; born 18 May 1982), is a Vietnamese pop singer, actor, producer and YouTuber.

Quang Vinh's vocal talent was discovered at a very young age of 11 when he participated "Đội Sơn Ca Nhà Thiếu Nhi Quận 1" in Ho Chi Minh City, and rapidly became well known for several hits such as "Cho Con", "Mẹ Hiền", "Tây Du Ký", and many more...

Some of the artist's career highlights were during his debut album, "Những Ngày Xưa Yêu Dấu" in 2000; when the music video for his song "Tình Yêu Tìm Thấy" was broadcast on national television channel VTV3; and the release of his fifth solo album, "Miền Cát Trắng" in 2003.

After a long hiatus, Quang Vinh returned to the entertainment scene with an acting role as ‘Đức Duy’ in the film "Tỉnh Giấc Tôi Thấy Mình Trong Ai", produced by actor Chi Pu. He had also put an emphasis on his comeback with a new song and music video "Điều Buồn Tênh", which reached over two million views on YouTube in just a short amount of time.

Currently, Quang Vinh is continuing his career in music. In addition to this long-term practice, he has channeled his passion for world exploration and experiencing new cultures into several travel shows of his own, where he is the producer and host: "Quang Vinh Passport", "Quang Vinh Đi Vietnam", "Quang Vinh Retreat", etc.

Life and career

1993–1998: Early career 
Quang Vinh was born on May 18th, 1982 in Ho Chi Minh City, Vietnam. Although coming from a family with no particular creative background, he had shown a great deal of potential in his vocal and musical capabilities. Towards the end of the artist’s primary school years, Quang Vinh was submitted by his parents to participate in the city’s well-known children’s performing arts centre, "Đội Sơn Ca Nhà Thiếu Nhi Quận 1", along with singer Hiền Thục, and Phạm Thanh Lan (a member of Mặt Trời Đỏ, and former member of the famed harmonizing group, Cadillac). Since then, he and his other kids of his age began to appear regularly in musical performances such as competitions or festivals, which were also broadcast on the radio and national television.

Quang Vinh's commitment to the music scene as a child had earned him a position as one of his generation's greatest young voices with songs like "Mẹ Hiền Yêu Dấu", "Cho Con", "Thằng Bờm", "Tây Du Ký", "Trăng Tròn", "Tuổi của Trăng", "Heal the World", "Con Voi", "Cô Giáo Mới", "Cánh Én Tuổi Thơ", and "Ước Mơ Hồng". Since then, he was given a special nickname by children across the country, "Hoàng Tử Sơn Ca", or ‘Prince Nightingale’.

In 1998, he was sent to Monsignor Bonner High School in Drexel Hill, Pennsylvania, an all-male Augustinian Catholic high school. With an impending graduation, Quang Vinh decided to move back to Vietnam in 2000, in order to pursue his passion to become a singer. He then signed a contract with Kim Lợi Studio, and proceeded to release his dream debut album, "Những Ngày Xưa Yêu Dấu" in 2001.

2000–2016: Professional singing career 
During his time with Kim Lợi Studio, Quang Vinh had released 3 albums: "Những Ngày Xưa Yêu Dấu", "Nói Với Em… Phai Dấu Cuộc Tình", and "Dòng Sông Mùa Đông… Lãng Quên Cuộc Tình".

In the beginning of 2003, his contract with Kim Lợi Studio had expired. With this opportunity, Quang Vinh decided to change his musical direction and build a new image for himself through preparations to release his fourth album.

The music video for "Tình Yêu Tìm Thấy" was consisted of 2 versions: CD & VCD. Directed by Phan Điền, the video was filmed in Hanoi at multiple well-known locations such as the Memorial of Literature, Thê Húc Bridge, Tạ Hiện Street, Long Biên Bridge, St. Joseph’s Cathedral of Hanoi, One Pillar Pagoda, and West Lake.

Carrying a collection of Quang Vinh's core hits, the album "Tình Yêu Tìm Thấy" brought him several prizes following its release: Làn Sóng Xanh's Upcoming Artist in 2003, Ngôi Sao Bạch Kim 2003, and VTV's Bài Hát Tôi Yêu 2003.

Shortly after, the artist had also completed his first live concert in the country’s capital, Hanoi, with intentions to promote his fourth album, representing a new chapter in his musical career. Over 10,000 people attended. Following this great success, another concert took place in celebration of the very beginning of Quang Vinh’s career as a musician, "Hoàng Tử Sơn Ca - Vào Đời", or "the Birth of Prince Nightingale", at Lan Anh Sports Club in Ho Chi Minh City.

After this, Quang Vinh had also released several albums that had great impact throughout his career: Miền Cát Trắng, Đánh Rơi Tình Yêu, Ngày Không Vội Vã, the collection: Xuân (Lời Tình Xuân), Hạ (Ve Kêu), Thu (Chuyện Ngày Hôm Qua), Đông (Anh Ru Em Ngủ), and others.

The year 2007 was when the artist collaborated with Bảo Thy to release the album, "Ngôi Nhà Hoa Hồng", which sold over 100,000 copies in a short time. The collaborative effort had produced many great hits, such as: "Ngôi Nhà Hoa Hồng", "Dịu Dàng Đến Từng Phút Giây", and "Vẫn Tin Mình Có Nhau". The pair went on to become one of the most loved duet partnerships in the music industry.

The following year, Quang Vinh released the album "Day & Night", which earned him two prestigious prizes: " Golden Album" award and "Fan's Favorite Album" award.

2016–2021: Comeback onstage 
On 11 November 2016, Quang Vinh returned to the music scene with the single "Điều Buồn Tênh" after a long hiatus. Then, as an act of gratitude to his fans, the artist released the album "Greatest Hits/The Memories", where he had recorded his most well-known songs since the beginning of his musical journey. The album received tremendous recognition and songs like "Phai Dấu Cuộc Tình" gained over 43 million views on Quang Vinh's official YouTube channel.

The year 2020 marked the first collaboration between Quang Vinh and the "King of Ballad", Mr. Siro, when the two came together to release a new music video for "Lạnh Từ Trong Tim". The visuals were filmed at Bà Nà Hills with the appearances of 11 celebrities across the entertainment fields such as: Diễm My 9x, Trịnh Xuân Nhản, Liz Kim Cương, Lynk Lee, Ma Ran Đô, Đinh Phương Nam, fashionista Thuận Nguyễn, and others. The music video took in a total of two billion Vietnamese đồng, which was Quang Vinh's most funded and epic project in his career up to date.

Filmography 
Quang Vinh had once began a contract with film company TFS, and granted a leading role as a teacher - Thầy Gia in the 10-episode series "Nữ Sinh", which was adapted from 3 famous novels by author Nguyễn Nhật Ánh (Nữ Sinh, Buổi Chiều Windows, and Bồ Câu Không Đưa Thư).

In 2016, he made a new comeback for the role Duc Duy in the movie "Wake Up" which was produced by actress Chi Pu.

Travel/ YouTuber 
Aside from his musical endeavors, Quang Vinh had also gained recognition through his role as a travel blogger since his return to the entertainment business in 2016. The reality travel show "Quang Vinh Passport" takes the audience to many corners of the world, such as Spain, the Maldives, Russia, Taiwan, Singapore, Bhutan, the Philippines and Bal.

2019: Quang Vinh represented Vietnam, to participate in Taiwan's "Embracing Taiwan" (a national television program) - The host travel to Taiwan to explore and experience its culture and the local cuisine that is rich and distinct flavours, along with Thailand, the Philippines, India, Malaysia and others.

2020: Introduction of a new travel show, "Quang Vinh Đi Vietnam". There are 28 episodes, where Quang Vinh is joined by a celebrity guest for each episode.

2021: Quang Vinh continues to release another travel/ musical show, "Quang Vinh Retreat", taking the audience to breathtaking sceneries of Vietnam, paired with duet performances with celebrity guests.

Discography

 Nếu em đi (Single) (2021)
 Lạnh từ trong tim (Single) (2020)
 Đừng yêu ai đậm sâu (Single) (2018)
 Greatest Hits/The Memories (2017)
 "Điều buồn tênh" (Single) (2016)
 Love Songs (2013)
 Beautiful Lover (CD + DVD) (2012)
 "Lạc trong nỗi đau" (Single) (2012)
 Thiên thần khóc (CD + VCD) (2011)
 "Đón xuân" (Single) (2011)
 Mơ một giấc mơ (CD + VCD) (2010)
 Day & Night (CD + VCD) (2008)
 Ngôi nhà hoa hồng (CD) (2007)
 Anh ru em ngủ (CD + VCD) (2007)
 Chuyện ngày hôm qua (CD + VCD) (2006)
 Ve kêu (CD) (2006)
 "Lời tình xuân" (Single) (2006)
 Giữ mãi một tình yêu (CD) (2005)
 Đánh rơi tình yêu (CD) (2004)
 Ngày không vội vã (CD, VCD) (2004)
 Miền cát trắng (CD) (2003)
 Vào đời (CD + VCD) (2003)
 Tình yêu tìm thấy (CD, VCD, Karaoke) (2003)
 Xin đừng hoài nghi (VCD, DVD, Karaoke) (2002)
 Dòng sông mùa đông... lãng quên cuộc tình (CD) (2002)
 Nói với em... phai dấu cuộc tình (CD, VCD, Karaoke) (2002)
 Những ngày xưa yêu dấu (CD, VCD, Karaoke) (2001)

Awards and honors
 2008: Golden Album Award: Favorite Album (Day & Night)
2006: Favourite Album (Ve Kêu) - Chương trình Sắc màu âm nhạc (Colour of Music) (May 2006)
 2006: Favourite Song voted by Audience ("Tự tin nói lời yêu thương") - Chương trình Nhạc Việt (Viet Music) (February 2006)
 2006: Favourite Artist - Chương trình Nhạc Việt (Viet Music) (February 2006)
 2006: Favourite Album ("Giữ Mãi Một Tình Yêu") - Chương trình sắc màu âm nhạc (Colour of Music) (January 2006)
 2005: Favourite Music Video for Miền Cát Trắng - VTV Bài hát tôi yêu
 2004: Làn Sóng Xanh Music Award for Miền Cát Trắng
 2003: Best New Artist - Làn Sóng Xanh Music Award
 2003: Best New Artist - Plantinum Star Music Award
 2003: Favourite Music Video for Tình Yêu Tìm Thấy - VTV Bài hát tôi yêu

References

1982 births
Living people
People from Ho Chi Minh City
Vietnamese idols
21st-century Vietnamese male singers